Marcinowice  (German: Merzdorf) is a village in the administrative district of Gmina Mściwojów, within Jawor County, Lower Silesian Voivodeship, in south-western Poland. Prior to 1945 it was in Germany.

References

Marcinowice